Carl Lee may refer to:

Carl Lee (American football), American football player 
Carl Lee (actor)
Carl Lee Jr., CEO of Snyder's of Hanover
Carl Lee Sr. on List of Barack Obama presidential campaign endorsements, 2008
R. B. Carl Lee, state legislator and farmer organizer in Arkansas

See also

Carlee